On 16 March 2022, during the Russian invasion of Ukraine, the Russian Armed Forces bombed the Donetsk Academic Regional Drama Theatre in Mariupol, Ukraine. It was used as an air raid shelter during the siege of Mariupol, sheltering a large number of civilians. Estimates of civilian deaths vary, ranging from at least a dozen (Amnesty International) to 600 (Associated Press).

Ukraine accused the Russian Armed Forces of deliberately bombing the theatre while it was sheltering civilians. Russia denied the allegations and instead accused the Azov Battalion of blowing up the building. The Russian claim has been refuted by independent investigations.

The theatre is among the many Ukrainian heritage and cultural sites destroyed during the invasion. The attack was classified as a war crime by the Organization for Security and Co-operation in Europe and Amnesty International.

Background

On 24 February, the Russian Armed Forces, working together with pro-Russian militias, besieged the port city of Mariupol, leading to heavy casualties. Supplies–such as food, gas, and electricity–were cut off. By 17 March, the mayor of Mariupol, Sergiy Orlov, estimated that 80–90% of the city had been destroyed due to shelling.

Mariupol city council officials stated that the theatre was the largest single air raid shelter in the city, sheltering 500 to 1,200 civilians, and at the time of the attack it contained only women and children. Satellite images of the theatre taken on 14 March show the word 'children' spelled out in two locations outside the theatre on the square in an attempt to identify it to invading forces as a civilian air raid shelter containing children, and not a military target.

Attack
On 16 March 2022, Ukraine accused Russian forces of shelling civilian areas in Mariupol. Artillery hit numerous locations, including a swimming pool building and a vehicle convoy; shelling then struck the theatre, reducing the building to rubble.

The time of the attack on the Donetsk Regional Academic Drama Theatre was shortly after 10am.

The bomb shelter in the basement of the theatre survived the bombing, but many people were still trapped underneath the burning rubble. A member of the Ukrainian parliament from Mariupol, Dmytro Gurin, said that the rescue efforts were hampered due to continued attacks on the area by Russian forces.

On 25 March, videos allegedly showing the immediate aftermath of the attack emerged on social media: a first video showed people covered in dust descending from the partially destroyed upper floors of the building; and a second video showed the site of the impact.

Victims
On 17 March, the number of casualties was unclear; some emerged alive.

By 18 March, around 130 survivors had been rescued. Mariupol City Council stated that according to initial information, no one had been killed, although one person was gravely wounded.

On 25 March, Mariupol City Council estimated that about 300 people had been killed as a result of the airstrike.

On 25 March, The Washington Post published an investigation that cited witnesses that said that all families that had been sheltering in the theater's basement had escaped unscathed and evacuations had begun before the bombing.    

On 4 May, Associated Press published an investigation with evidence pointing to 600 dead in the airstrike. Many survivors estimated that around 200 people –including rescuers– had escaped through the main exit or one side entrance; the other side and the back were crushed.

On 7 June 2022, Human Rights Watch and Kharkiv Human Rights Protection Group separately announced that Ukrainian refugees, as well as civilians forcibly deported to Russia, were being pressured and intimidated to implicate Ukrainian military personnel in war crimes. This includes a case where a refugee was pressured to implicate the Azov Regiment in the theatre airstrike.

Reactions
Ukrainian President Zelenskyy accused Russia of committing a war crime.

Russian media have widely reported that the Russian Ministry of Defense denied responsibility for the bombing and accused the Azov Battalion of planning and carrying out the theatre bombing instead. They claimed that no Russian forces carried out air strikes within the city and blamed Azov Battalion for "taking hostages" of civilians and blowing up the upper floors of the theatre.

Italy's Minister of Culture, Dario Franceschini, made an offer to the Ukrainian government to rebuild the theatre.

OSCE report
On 13 April, the Organization for Security and Co-operation in Europe (OSCE) published a report which covered the Mariupol theatre airstrike.

AP investigation
On 4 May, Associated Press (AP) published an investigation of the airstrike, increasing the Ukrainian government's estimate of about 300 hundred dead to 600 dead. It also refuted Russian claims that the theatre was demolished by Ukrainian forces or served as a Ukrainian military base:

Amnesty International report
On 30 June 2022, Amnesty International concluded that the airstrike was perpetrated by the Russian Forces which used two  bombs, and that it is a war crime.

Aftermath 
On July 11, 2022 the Ukrainian media reported that the theater rubble was cleaned by Russians and bodies of victims were allegedly taken away to an unknown place.

A Potemkin village styled scene has been built around the ruins of Mariupol Drama Theatre.

In February 2023, Russian journalist  was sentenced to six years in prison under Russia's war censorship laws for publishing information about the Mariupol theatre airstrike.

See also
Mariupol art school bombing
Mariupol hospital airstrike

Notes

References

2020s building bombings
Airstrikes conducted by Russia
Attacks on buildings and structures in 2022
Attacks on theatres
Building bombings in Europe
March 2022 crimes in Europe
March 2022 events in Ukraine
Russian war crimes in Ukraine
Massacres in Ukraine
theatre airstrike
War crimes during the 2022 Russian invasion of Ukraine
Airstrikes during the 2022 Russian invasion of Ukraine
21st-century mass murder in Ukraine
Mass murder in 2022
Child murder during the 2022 Russian invasion of Ukraine